Răduleşti is a commune in Ialomiţa County, Romania.

Răduleşti may also refer to several places in Romania:

 Răduleşti, a village in Dobra Commune, Hunedoara County
 Răduleşti, a village in Căuaș Commune, Satu Mare County
 Răduleşti, a village in Crevenicu Commune, Teleorman County
 Răduleşti, a village in Vânatori Commune, Vrancea County

See also 
 Radu (given name)
 Radu (surname)
 Rădulescu (surname)
 Răducan (surname)
 Răducanu (surname)
 Rădeni (disambiguation)
 Rădești (disambiguation)
 Răduțești (disambiguation)